The 1908 United States presidential election in Georgia took place on November 3, 1908, as part of the wider United States presidential election. Voters chose 13 representatives, or electors, to the Electoral College, who voted for president and vice president.

Background
Following Reconstruction, Georgia would be the first former Confederate state to substantially disenfranchise its newly enfranchised freedmen, doing so in the early 1870s. This largely limited the Republican Party to a few North Georgia counties with substantial Civil War Unionist sentiment – chiefly Fannin but also to a lesser extent Pickens, Gilmer and Towns. The Democratic Party served as the guardian of white supremacy against a Republican Party historically associated with memories of Reconstruction, and the main competition became Democratic primaries, which state laws restricted to whites on the grounds of the Democratic Party being legally a private club.

However, politics after the first demobilization by a cumulative poll tax was chaotic. Third-party movements, chiefly the Populist Party, gained support amongst poor whites and the remaining black voters in opposition to the planter elite. The fact that Georgia had already substantially reduced its poor white and black electorate two decades ago, alongside pressure from urban elites in Atlanta, meant the Populist movement substantially faded in the late 1890s. Nevertheless, this did not prevent demands for more complete disenfranchisement after the state’s politics again turned chaotic as former Vice-Presidential candidate Thomas E. Watson attempted to revive the Populist Party in 1904, whilst Hoke Smith ran for Governor as a radical reformist in 1906.

The aim of co-opting the Populists led Georgia to become the last former Confederate state to initiate a full-scale disenfranchisement plan to largely eliminate the seventy thousand or so blacks who remained on the rolls. The process, involving a literacy test and a grandfather clause in addition to the poll tax, alongside statewide white primaries, was achieved in the next presidential election year, when a transformed Watson ran for the Populist Party on a white supremacist campaign. At the same time the Republican Party aimed to make gains in the South because of opposition by developing manufacturers to William Jennings Bryan’s populism, and by nominee William Howard Taft’s willingness to accept black disfranchisement.

Vote
At the beginning of September, Taft spoke of carrying Georgia and other southern states, though this idea was dismissed by Democratic committee members. Polls, when taken in October, always suggested Bryan would win the state, though by a smaller margin than usual. This was indeed the observed result, although anti-populist sentiment resulted in the GOP carrying twelve secessionist upcountry counties that had never gone Republican before. Watson fell substantially from his 1904 performance, and would disband the Populist Party after the election.

Results

Results by county

Notes

References

Georgia
1908
1908 Georgia (U.S. state) elections